Franses can refer to
 Jack Franses (1927–2010), English expert on Islamic art, carpets and textiles. 
 Philip Hans Franses (born 1963), Dutch economist

See also 
 France (disambiguation)
 Fransen, Dutch surname
 Franssen, Dutch surname